James Murray was a Republican politician from the state of Ohio. He was Ohio Attorney General in 1861 and 1862.

James Murray was born in Scotland about 1830. In 1831, when about a year old, his family moved to Sidney, Ohio.  He was educated in the public schools, and admitted to the bar in 1851. He immediately relocated to Perrysburg, Ohio. He was elected Ohio Attorney General in 1860, and served one term. He remained a resident of Wood County, Ohio until the close of his term, and then returned to Sidney, where he died in 1879. The only other political office he ever held was as mayor of Perrysburg.

Notes

References

People from Perrysburg, Ohio
People from Sidney, Ohio
Ohio Attorneys General
Ohio Republicans
Ohio lawyers
1830 births
1881 deaths
Mayors of places in Ohio
Scottish emigrants to the United States
19th-century American politicians
19th-century American lawyers